Wardha Saleem is a Pakistani fashion designer and the CEO of the Pakistan Fashion Council.

Early life
Wardha Saleem was born in Hyderabad, Pakistan, and now resides in Karachi, Pakistan with her family. Her elder brother Nubain Ali is also involved with the fashion and media industry of Pakistan and is a personal support and management partner for Wardha's label. 
She is an alumnus of the Indus Valley School of Art and Architecture where she graduated with a distinction in textile design.

Career
In 2006, after a career that entailed teaching textile and fashion at Indus Valley, Saleem launched her label Wardha Saleem. She is credited with bringing Pakistani truck art into mainstream fashion.  In 2011, Wardha launched her printed Lawn Collection. For the collection, she was nominated for the Lux Style Awards in the category for Best Lawn Brand. In March 2012, she made her debut on the runway at the Showcase with her luxury prêt-à-porter line "Jhirki", followed closely by another collection in April 2012 for Fashion Week Pakistan by the name of "Sinned" and a line of patchwork outerwear in October 2012 consisting of juxtaposed black-and-white patterns with denim and colourful Pakistani folk toy motifs. Her creations have gone on to include a "Folk Play", "Doodle Junction" and most recently, a "Dasht-e-Gul" series showcased at Fashion Pakistan Week 2014. She launched her Bridal Wear at the Pakistan Fashion Design Council (PFDC) Loreal Paris Bridal Week 2014 in Lahore, Pakistan, with her debut collection titled "Madhubani".

References

website:
https://www.wardhasaleem.com/

Pakistani fashion designers
Pakistani women fashion designers
Indus Valley School of Art and Architecture alumni
Year of birth missing (living people)
Living people